Maksim Ivanovich Samorodov (born 29 June 2002) is a Kazakh footballer who plays as a forward for Aktobe and the Kazakhstan national team.

Career
Samorodov made his international debut for Kazakhstan on 28 March 2021 in a 2022 FIFA World Cup qualification match against France, which finished as a 2–0 home loss.

Career statistics

International

References

External links
 
 
 Maksim Samorodov at Vesti.kz

2002 births
Living people
People from Aktobe
Kazakhstani footballers
Kazakhstan youth international footballers
Kazakhstan international footballers
Association football forwards
FC Aktobe players
Kazakhstan Premier League players
Kazakhstan First Division players